German submarine U-841 was a Type IXC/40 U-boat built for Nazi Germany's Kriegsmarine during World War II.

U-841 was ordered on 20 January 1941 from DeSchiMAG AG Weser in Bremen under the yard number 1047. Her keel was laid down on 21 March 1942 and after seven months of construction the U-boat was launched on 21 October 1942. On 6 February 1943 she was commissioned into service under the command of Oberleutnant zur See Werner Bender (Crew 36) in the 4th U-boat Flotilla.

Design
German Type IXC/40 submarines were slightly larger than the original Type IXCs. U-841 had a displacement of  when at the surface and  while submerged. She had two shafts and two  propellers.

U-841 was fitted with six  torpedo tubes (four fitted at the bow and two at the stern), 22 torpedoes, one  SK C/32 naval gun, 180 rounds, and a  SK C/30 as well as a  C/30 anti-aircraft gun. The boat had a complement of forty-eight.

Service history
Transferred to 2nd U-boat Flotilla, U-841 left Kiel for Bergen on 26 August 1943 arriving there six days later. On 9 September 1943 she left Bergen for operations in the North Atlantic. Stopping over in Trondheim, she joined wolfpack Schlieffen operating against convoy ONS 20 in October 1943. In the afternoon of 17 October 1943, U-841 was spotted and attacked by an aircraft from 120 Squadron, RAF. One of ONS 20's escorts, picked up U-841 on its ASDIC later that day and depth-charged it. Heavily damaged, the U-boat surfaced and was scuttled by its crew. While the crew abandoned ship, Byard opened fire on the U-boat. 27 crew members, including the captain, died, while 27 survivors were picked up.

References

Bibliography

External links

World War II submarines of Germany
German Type IX submarines
1942 ships
U-boats commissioned in 1943
U-boats scuttled in 1943
Ships built in Bremen (state)
Maritime incidents in October 1943